The Bird Hammock is a historic site in Wakulla Beach, Florida. It is located two miles north of Wakulla Beach. On December 15, 1972, it was added to the U.S. National Register of Historic Places.

It is primarily an archaeological site, as it was inhabited prior to 1000 A.D. by Native Americans during the Swift Creek to Weedon Island periods. The area contains burial mounds and middens, and is believed to have also served for ceremonial purposes. Access is restricted to preserve the site's integrity.

References

External links
 Wakulla County listings at National Register of Historic Places
 Wakulla County listings at Florida's Office of Cultural and Historical Programs

Geography of Wakulla County, Florida
Archaeological sites in Florida
Mounds in Florida